Jury Sukhorukov (Ukraine: Юрій Сухоруков; born 29 March 1968) is an Olympic shooter from Ukraine. He won a silver medal in the Men's 50 metre rifle three positions event at the 2008 Summer Olympics in Beijing.

References

1968 births
Living people
Ukrainian male sport shooters
ISSF rifle shooters
Shooters at the 2004 Summer Olympics
Shooters at the 2008 Summer Olympics
Olympic shooters of Ukraine
Olympic silver medalists for Ukraine
Olympic medalists in shooting
Medalists at the 2008 Summer Olympics
Shooters at the 2015 European Games
European Games competitors for Ukraine
Shooters at the 2019 European Games